John Butterfield may refer to:
John Butterfield, Baron Butterfield (1920–2000), British medical researcher
John Butterfield (stagecoach operator) (1801–1869), US stagecoach operator
Jock Butterfield (full name John Rutherford Butterfield), New Zealand rugby league footballer of the 1950s and 1960s